The 1974–75 Divizia A  was the 57th season of Divizia A, the top-level football league of Romania.

Teams

League table

Results

Top goalscorers

Champion squad

See also 
 1974–75 Divizia B
 1974–75 Divizia C

References

Liga I seasons
Romania
1974–75 in Romanian football